The ISSF World Cup was introduced by the International Shooting Sport Federation in 2016 to provide an equivalent competition to the ISSF World Cup, but for junior shooters. It covers a variety of both Olympic and non-Olympic events in rifle, pistol and shotgun, and covers one or two competitions per year in each event. Unlike in the senior version of the event, there is currently no junior world cup final.

The ISSF defines a 'junior' as an athlete under the age of 21 on December 31 of the competition year.

Seasons and venues
The venues are decided by the ISSF from time to time. However, some are more common than others. Save for the 2017 world cup, Suhl in Germany has hosted a competition every year. Other stages of the competition have been held both in and out of Europe: for example in Porpetto, Gabala and Sydney.

Note that the 2017 world cup consisted of only shotgun events, as the Junior World Championships of the same year covered rifle and pistol events.

Events

The following events have all featured in the ISSF Junior World Cup in recent years:

Rifle
 10 meter air rifle
 50 meter rifle prone
 50 meter rifle three positions

Pistol
 10 meter air pistol
 25 meter pistol
 25 meter standard pistol
 25 meter rapid fire pistol
 50 meter pistol

Shotgun
 Trap
 Double trap
 Skeet

References

External links 
 Official Website

ISSF shooting competitions
Shooting